William Henry Hill (May 1, 1767December 9, 1808) was a Congressional representative from North Carolina; born in Brunswick Town, Brunswick County, North Carolina; attended the public schools in Boston, Massachusetts; engaged in agricultural pursuits; studied law in Boston; was admitted to the bar and practiced; appointed United States district attorney for North Carolina by President George Washington in 1790; member of the State senate in 1794; elected as a Federalist to the Sixth and Seventh Congresses (March 4, 1799 – March 3, 1803); appointed judge of the United States District Court for the District of North Carolina by President John Adams at the close of his term but the designation was withdrawn by President Thomas Jefferson; returned to his estate near Wilmington, North Carolina, where he engaged in agricultural pursuits until his death there in 1808; interment in the family burial ground on his estate, "Hilton," near Wilmington.

See also 
 Sixth United States Congress
 Seventh United States Congress

References

External links
 U.S. Congress Biographical Directory entry

Hill, William H.
1767 births
1808 deaths
Burials at City Cemetery (Raleigh, North Carolina)
Federalist Party members of the United States House of Representatives from North Carolina